William Cumming Rose (April 4, 1887 – September 25, 1985) was an American biochemist and nutritionist. He discovered the amino acid threonine, and his research determined the necessity for essential amino acids in diet and the minimum daily requirements of all amino acids for optimal growth.

Early life
William Cumming Rose was born in Greenville, South Carolina. He attended various local schools, but his father John M. Rose, who was a Presbyterian minister, began to homeschool William in Latin, Greek, and Hebrew when he was 14 years old. He also studied an introductory chemistry textbook by Ira Remsen. When he was 16, he studied at Davidson College in North Carolina for his bachelor's degree. He took up graduate education at Yale University studying food chemistry with Russell Chittenden and Lafayette Mendel. He was granted a PhD in 1911.

Career
Rose taught for a time at University of Pennsylvania with Alonzo Taylor. Taylor recommended him to University of Texas Galveston Medical School to organize a department of biochemistry. In 1922, he went to the University of Illinois as professor of physiological chemistry, a title which was changed to professor of biochemistry in 1936. From 1922 to 1955 he transformed his department into a center of excellence for the training of biochemists.

At Illinois, Rose focused his research work on amino acid metabolism and nutrition. He found that the 19 amino acids then known were not sufficient for growth, and this led to his discovery in 1935 of the last of the common amino acids, α-amino-β-hydroxy-n-butyric acid, later named threonine. His studies also distinguished the amino acids that are absolutely essential from those that are necessary only for optimal growth.  His studies further led him to the point where it was "practicable to evaluate proteins in terms of their ability to meet human needs." In June 1949 he published "Amino Acid Requirements of Man".

Rose served as President of the American Society of Biological Chemists from 1939 to 1941.  He was appointed to the Food and Nutrition Board of the National Research Council, which advised government agencies on dietary recommendations. Rose retired from the University of Illinois in 1955.

He recalled the role of Yale through the work of Samuel William Johnson, Chittenden, and Mendel in 1977 with the article "Recollections of personalities involved in the early history of American biochemistry". Further, he recounted the biochemical advances he witnessed in "How did it happen".

Awards and honors
 1936 – Became a member of the United States National Academy of Sciences
 1939–1941 – President of the American Society of Biological Chemists
 1945–1946 – President of the American Institute of Nutrition
 1949 – Osborne and Mendel Award of the American Institute of Nutrition
 1952 – Honorary Doctor of Sciences Degree from the University of Illinois
 1952 – Willard Gibbs Medal of the American Chemical Society
 1957 – Kenneth A. Spencer award of the American Chemical Society
 1961 – Twentieth Anniversary Award of the Nutrition Foundation
 1966 – Received National Medal of Science
 1979 – William C. Rose Award initiated

References

External links
 H. E. Carter & Minor J. Coon: William Cumming Rose from National Academy of Sciences
 Daphne A. Roe (1981) William Cumming Rose: A biographical sketch Journal of Nutrition 111(8):1311–20.
 Noyes Laboratory at the University of Illinois, Urbana-Champaign from American Chemical Society National Historic Chemical Landmarks
 William C. Rose Papers, University of Illinois Archives

1887 births
1985 deaths
American biochemists
National Medal of Science laureates
Members of the United States National Academy of Sciences
American nutritionists